This is a list of the highest feature on Earth for each category.

References

Extreme points of Earth